Goseong may refer to:

 Goseong County, South Gyeongsang, a county in South Gyeongsang Province, South Korea
 Goseong County, Gangwon, a county in Gangwon Province, South Korea
 Kosong County, a county in Kangwon Province, North Korea